The men's 200 metres event at the 1998 World Junior Championships in Athletics was held in Annecy, France, at Parc des Sports on 31 July and 1 August.

Medalists

Results

Final
1 August
Wind: -0.2 m/s

Semifinals
1 August

Semifinal 1
Wind: -0.7 m/s

Semifinal 2
Wind: +1.0 m/s

Quarterfinals
31 July

Quarterfinal 1
Wind: -0.1 m/s

Quarterfinal 2
Wind: 0.0 m/s

Quarterfinal 3
Wind: -0.2 m/s

Quarterfinal 4
Wind: -0.9 m/s

Heats
31 July

Heat 1
Wind: +0.6 m/s

Heat 2
Wind: -0.9 m/s

Heat 3
Wind: -0.2 m/s

Heat 4
Wind: +0.4 m/s

Heat 5
Wind: +0.1 m/s

Heat 6
Wind: +0.7 m/s

Heat 7
Wind: +1.6 m/s

Participation
According to an unofficial count, 51 athletes from 41 countries participated in the event.

References

200 metres
200 metres at the World Athletics U20 Championships